The Rawlings Gold Glove Award, usually referred to as the Gold Glove, is the award given annually to the Major League Baseball players judged to have exhibited superior individual fielding performances at each fielding position in both the National League (NL) and the American League (AL), as voted by the managers and coaches in each league. Managers are not permitted to vote for their own players.  Eighteen Gold Gloves are awarded each year (with the exception of 1957, 1985, 2007, and 2018), one at each of the nine positions in each league. In 1957, the baseball glove manufacturer Rawlings created the Gold Glove Award to commemorate the best fielding performance at each position. The award was created from a glove made from gold lamé-tanned leather and affixed to a walnut base. Initially, only one Gold Glove per position was awarded to the top fielder at each position in the entire league; however, separate awards were given for the National and American Leagues beginning in 1958.

Ozzie Smith, known as "the Wizard of Oz", has won the most Gold Glove Awards at shortstop; he captured 13 awards in his 19 seasons with the St. Louis Cardinals. Omar Vizquel is second among shortstops with 11 wins; he won two with the San Francisco Giants in the National League after winning nine with the Seattle Mariners and the Cleveland Indians in the American League. Luis Aparicio won nine times at shortstop for the third-highest total, followed by Mark Belanger with eight wins. Dave Concepción and Derek Jeter have won five awards; four-time winners at shortstop include Tony Fernández, Jimmy Rollins, Andrelton Simmons and Alan Trammell. Hall of Famers who have won Gold Glove Awards at shortstop include Smith, Aparicio, Trammell, Ernie Banks, Robin Yount, Barry Larkin and Cal Ripken Jr., whose 2,632 consecutive games played earned him his "Iron Man" nickname.

Vizquel made the fewest errors during a shortstop's winning season, with three in 2000; his .995 fielding percentage that season leads American League and major league shortstops, and his 2006 total of four errors is tied for the National League lead with Rey Ordóñez (1999). Ordóñez' .994 fielding percentage in 1999 leads National Leaguers in that category. Aparicio leads winners in putouts, with 305 in 1960; Concepción (1976) and Smith (1983) are tied for the National League lead with 304. Smith's 621 assists are best among all shortstops, and Belanger (552 assists in 1974) is the American League leader. Gene Alley turned 128 double plays in 1966 to lead winners in that category; Ripken leads American Leaguers, with 119 turned in 1992.

Key

American League winners

National League winners

Footnotes
In 1957, Gold Gloves were given to the top fielders in Major League Baseball, instead of separate awards for the National and American Leagues; therefore, the winners are the same in each table.

See also
Gold Glove middle infield duos

References
General

Inline citations

External links
Rawlings Gold Glove Award Website

Gold Glove Award